Chesapeake High School may refer to:

 Chesapeake High School (Anne Arundel County), a high school in Pasadena, Maryland, United States
 Chesapeake High School (Baltimore County), a high school in Essex, Maryland, United States
 Chesapeake High School (Ohio), a high school in Chesapeake, Ohio, United States